Dharani Dhar Awasthi (28 September 1922, Naret village, Pithoragarh District, Uttarakhand – 21 August 2011, Lucknow) was an Indian botanist, taxonomist, and lichenologist, often given the appellation "Father of Indian Lichenology".

Education and career
Awasthi graduated in botany from the University of Lucknow with B.Sc. in 1943 and M.Sc. in 1945. From 1945 to 1946 he was a research assistant in the University of Lucknow's department of botany. From 1946 to 1948 he worked at Kolkata's Botanical Garden and Herbarium in a stipendiary training programme in systematic botany and taxonomy. In 1947 he received a Ph.D. from the University of Lucknow. His doctoral advisor was Sachindra Nath Das Gupta (1902–1990).  From 1948 to 1952 Awasthi worked as a botanical assistant at Lucknow's National Botanical Research Institute (NBRI). From 1952 until the end of his career he was (except for sabbaticals) a faculty member in the University of Lucknow's botany department. With support from the Fulbright Program he studied from 1960 to 1963 in the US for advanced training in lichenology under William Alfred Weber at the University of Colorado Boulder. There in 1963 Awasthi received his second Ph.D. In 1963 he returned to the University of Lucknow. During his career there he was the doctoral advisor for eight Ph.D. students, including Dalip Kumar Upreti. At the University of Lucknow, when Awasthi was superannuated in the 1990s, Lucknow's pioneering school of lichenology was closed, but his students flourished in various universities and institutions.

The lichen genera Awasthiella and Awasthia, as well as several lichen species, are named in his honour.

Awards and honours
 1978 — Fellow of the Indian Academy of Sciences
 1984 — Fellow of the Indian National Science Academy
 1991 — Professor P Maheshwari Lecture Award of the Indian National Science Academy
 1992 — Acharius Medal of the International Association of Lichenology
 1993 — Honorary Member of the British Lichen Society
 2011 — Dharani Dhar Awasthi Award established by the International Association for Lichenology to be given to a "prominent young researcher working and living in a low income country, who has completed a Ph.D. within five years prior to the submission deadline"

Selected publications

Articles

Books and monographs

References

External links
 
 

1922 births
2011 deaths
20th-century Indian botanists
21st-century Indian botanists
Indian lichenologists
University of Lucknow alumni
University of Colorado Boulder alumni
Academic staff of the University of Lucknow
Fellows of the Indian Academy of Sciences
Fellows of the Indian National Science Academy
People from Pithoragarh district
Acharius Medal recipients
Indian expatriates in the United States